McCandless, also spelled MacCandless, is an Irish and sometimes Scottish surname, primarily from Ulster and Donegal. It is derived from the Gaelic  meaning 'son of Cuindlis/Cuindleas', a given name of uncertain meaning. There are many anglicized variations (McAndles, McCanliss, etc.). The less common spelling McCandlish is primarily found in Scotland. The name is etymologically related to the west-central Irish  (anglicized Conliss, Quinlisk, Cundlish, etc.) which means 'descendant of Cuindlis/Cuindleas'. The earliest form of the given name can be traced back to an abbot from the 8th century called Cuindles.

Notable people
 Al McCandless (1927–2017), US Congressman
 Billy McCandless (1894–1955), Northern Irish football player and manager
 Bruce McCandless (1911–1968), US Navy rear admiral, and Medal of Honor recipient
 Bruce McCandless II (1937–2017), astronaut who made the first untethered spacewalk
 Byron McCandless (1881–1967), commodore in the US Navy; vexillologist
 Christopher McCandless (1968–1992), American hiker and itinerant traveler who starved to death in Alaska; the subject of multiple non-fiction books and documentaries, beginning with Into the Wild (1996)
 Cromie McCandless (1921–1992), Northern Irish motorcycle road racer; brother of Rex
 Ezra McCandless (born Monica Kay, 1998), an American who was convicted of the murder of Alex Woodworth
 Jack McCandless (1892–1940), Irish football player and manager
 Lincoln Loy McCandless (1859–1940), American politician, cattle rancher, industrialist from Hawaii
 Paul McCandless (born 1947), American jazz woodwind player and composer
 Ray B. McCandless (1889–1931), American college sports coach
 Rex McCandless (1915–1992), Northern Irish motorcycle road racer, designer of the Norton Featherbed motorcycle frame; brother of Cromie
 Scott Cook "Jack" McCandless (1891–1961), Major League Baseball player
 Stanley McCandless (1897–1967), considered to be the first theatrical lighting educator
 William McCandless (1834–1884), Union Army officer in the American Civil War, and later member of the Pennsylvania State Senate
 Wilson McCandless (1810–1882), US federal judge from Pennsylvania

See also 
 McCandless (disambiguation) – including place names, vessels, fictional characters, etc.
 McCandlish, a less common form of the name, principally Scottish
 McCanles Gang (sometimes also rendered McCandless), an alleged outlaw gang in the American West of the early 1860s
 Ó Cuindlis, an etymologically related west Irish surname dating to the 14th century; anglicized as Conlisk, Cundlish, Quinlist, and several other variants

References

Surnames
Surnames of Irish origin
Surnames of Scottish origin